Maor is a moshav in north-central Israel. The word Maor means a light or luminary in Hebrew. Located near Baqa al-Gharbiyye, it falls under the jurisdiction of Menashe Regional Council.

History
The moshav was established in 1953 by Jewish immigrants from Romania and Poland; was abandoned after several years, and re-established in 1957 by Jewish immigrants from Yemen. Some residents work in agriculture on the moshav, and others live on the moshav but work elsewhere.

References

Moshavim
Menashe Regional Council
Populated places in Haifa District
Polish-Jewish culture in Israel
Romanian-Jewish culture in Israel
Populated places established in 1953
Yemeni-Jewish culture in Israel
1953 establishments in Israel